Heringomyia zernyana is a species of tephritid or fruit flies in the genus Heringomyia of the family Tephritidae.

Distribution
Tanzania, Zimbabwe.

References

Tephritinae
Insects described in 1940
Diptera of Africa